Redmain may refer to:

Red Main, a river in Germany
Redmain, Cumbria, a hamlet in England

See also
Redmayne